Luisa Fernanda Portocarrero Diaz (born May 05, 1977) is a Guatemalan artistic gymnast. As an elite level gymnast, she represented Guatemala at the 1992 Summer Olympics, in Barcelona, Spain. In addition to the Olympics, she participated in the 1991 Pan American Games; winning a bronze in the balance beam. She placed as high as twelfth in the world at the 1993 World Artistic Gymnastics Championships also. Throughout her elite career, she trained at Sport Seneca, in Canada.

Following her elite career, she competed for the UCLA Bruins gymnastics team, at the University of California, Los Angeles – contributing to the team's first National title in 1997.

Eponymous skill 
Portocarrero has one eponymous skill listed in the Code of Points.

References 

1976 births
Guatemalan female artistic gymnasts
UCLA Bruins women's gymnasts
Living people
Olympic gymnasts of Guatemala
Gymnasts at the 1992 Summer Olympics
Gymnasts at the 1991 Pan American Games
Pan American Games bronze medalists for Guatemala
Pan American Games medalists in gymnastics
Medalists at the 1991 Pan American Games
Originators of elements in artistic gymnastics
20th-century Guatemalan women